The 1899 Dublin County Council election was held on 6 April 1899. The election was peaceful, however rain prevented many voters from travelling to polling stations.

Aggregate results

Ward results

Balbriggan

Blackrock

Castleknock

Coolock

Dalkey

Donnybrook

Drumcondra

Dundrum

Howth

Kingstown

Lucan

Lusk

New Kilmainham

Pembroke West

Rathcoole

Rathfarnham

Rathmines East

Rathmines West

Stillorgan

Swords

References

1899 Irish local elections
1899